Rafael Ramos (29 October 1911 - 2 september 1985) was a Spanish racing cyclist. He rode in the 1937 Tour de France.

References

External links
 

1911 births
Year of death missing
Spanish male cyclists
Place of birth missing
Sportspeople from the Province of Huelva
Cyclists from Andalusia
Spanish emigrants to France
Spanish Vuelta a España stage winners

1985 deaths